Gabriel Palâtre (1830-1878) was a Jesuit missionary in Shanghai, China and campaigner against the practice of female infanticide.

Publications 

 Relations de la mission de Nan-kin confiée aux religieux de la Compagnie de Jésus
 L'infanticide et l'oeuvre de la Saint-Enfance en Chine   
 Le pèlerinage de Notre-Dame-Auxiliatrice, à Zô-Sè, dans le vicariat apostolique de Nan-Kin 
 Relations de la mission de Nan-kin confiée aux religieux de la Compagnie de Jésus
 L'infanticide et l'oeuvre de la Sainte-Enfance en Chine

References

Bibliography

External links
 

1830 births
1878 deaths
Jesuit missionaries in China
19th-century French Jesuits
French Roman Catholic missionaries
French expatriates in China